Tryggve Point is a point 1 nautical mile (1.9 km) northwest of Turks Head on the west side of Ross Island. First charted by the British Antarctic Expedition, 1910–13, under Scott, who named it for Tryggve Gran, Norwegian ski expert with the expedition.

Headlands of Ross Island